Chad Louis Duell (born September 14, 1987) is an American actor. He is recognized for playing Michael Corinthos on the American soap opera General Hospital.

Duell's portrayal of Michael Corinthos garnered him nominations for the Daytime Emmy Award for Outstanding Younger Actor in a Drama Series in 2011, 2012 and 2014. This was followed by his nomination and win for the Daytime Emmy Award for Outstanding Supporting Actor in a Drama Series in 2015.

Education and career
Duell attended Mountainside Middle School and Desert Mountain High School in Scottsdale, Arizona, where he played football and participated in the theater program. He dropped out before what would have been his senior year to pursue an acting career.

After dropping out he moved to Los Angeles where he landed a minor role on Disney's hit sitcom, The Suite Life on Deck. Duell also booked a minor role on another Disney series, The Wizards of Waverly Place. In March 2010, it was announced he would replace Drew Garrett in the role of Michael Corinthos on General Hospital. In 2017, it was announced Duell would appear in the third season of the Amazon Prime series The Bay in the role of Adam Kenway.

Personal life
Duell proposed to his girlfriend of nine months, Taylor Novack, at Disney World in August 2011. The couple married in a private ceremony on September 15, 2012. The marriage was annulled in late 2012, with Duell saying that it had been too soon. Duell dated fellow actress Courtney Hope, and the two were engaged on Valentine's Day 2021 after five years of dating. The couple got married on October 23, 2021, and split less than two months later. In January 2022, Duell revealed neither he nor Hope had "signed anything" and stated they were not "married or anything." In 2022 he began dating Luana Lucci. On March 6, 2023 the couple revealed on Instagram that they were expecting their first child

Filmography

Awards and nominations

References

External links
 

1987 births
Living people
American people of English descent
American male television actors
American male soap opera actors
Daytime Emmy Award winners
Daytime Emmy Award for Outstanding Supporting Actor in a Drama Series winners
Place of birth missing (living people)